Zoox, Inc. is a subsidiary of Amazon developing autonomous vehicles that provide Mobility-as-a-Service. It is headquartered in Foster City, California and has offices of operations in the San Francisco Bay Area and Seattle, Washington. Zoox sits in the Amazon Devices & Services organization alongside other Amazon units like Amazon Lab126, Amazon Alexa, and Kuiper Systems.

History 

Zoox was founded in 2014 by Australian artist-designer Tim Kentley-Klay and Jesse Levinson, son of Apple Inc. chairman Arthur D. Levinson, who was developing self-driving technology at Stanford University. The name "Zoox" is a reference to Zooxanthellae, a marine organism that, like the Zoox robo-taxi, depends on renewable energy and is able to maintain a symbiotic relationship with organisms in its surrounding habitat.

In January 2019, Zoox appointed a new CEO, Aicha Evans, who was previously the Chief Strategy Officer at Intel. On June 26, 2020, Amazon and Zoox signed a definitive merger agreement, under which Amazon acquired Zoox as a wholly-owned subsidiary for over $1.2 billion. As is the case with other Amazon subsidiaries like Amazon Web Services, Zoox has no independent board of directors, but operates as a separate legal entity with its own governance structure. Zoox sits within the Amazon Devices & Services organization with Evans reporting into Amazon Senior Vice President, Dave Limp.

Development and operations
Zoox is creating an entirely new autonomous vehicle targeted at the robo-taxi market. The company's approach is centered around the fact that a retrofitted vehicle is not optimized for autonomy. Zoox has applied the latest techniques in automotive, robotics and renewable energy to build a symmetrical, bi-directional battery-electric vehicle that solves for the unique challenges of autonomous mobility.

The company has used retrofitted Toyota Highlanders with their self-driving system in final preparation for their commercial vehicle reveal in December 2020. As of July 2018 test driving was taking place in both San Francisco's Financial District and North Beach districts, as well as Las Vegas.

Progress and competition 
In December 2018, Zoox became the first company to gain approval for providing self-driving transport services to the public in California. By July 2018, according to Bloomberg, Zoox had raised $800 million in venture capital, at a valuation of $3.2 billion. Draper Fisher Jurvetson is an investor in the company. In September 2020, Zoox became the fourth company in the State of California to receive permit to test driverless automobiles on public roads. On December 14, 2020, Zoox showcased a fully autonomous, all-electric, purpose-built vehicle that is capable of driving up to 75 mph.

On March 20, 2019, Tesla, Inc. filed a lawsuit against Zoox and several now-former Tesla employees (who left Tesla for employment at Zoox) alleging theft of Tesla's proprietary information and trade secrets related to warehousing, shipping, and logistics in late 2018 and early 2019. The lawsuit was settled for an undisclosed sum in April 2020 where Zoox "acknowledged that certain of its new hires from Tesla were in possession of Tesla documents pertaining to shipping, receiving, and warehouse procedures when they joined Zoox's logistics team".

In July 2022, Zoox became the first purpose-built, fully autonomous, all-electric passenger vehicle that was certified to the existing Federal Motor Vehicle Safety Standards (FMVSS) without the need for regulatory changes or exemption requests.

In 2023, Zoox was given approval by the California Department of Motor Vehicles (DMV) to begin testing self-driving robotaxis on open public roads with passengers on board. The DMV provided Zoox with a limited permit to operate on roads at speeds of up to 35 miles an hour at a designated area around its Foster City headquarters.

References

External links 
 

Self-driving car companies
Companies based in Foster City, California
Transportation companies based in California
2014 establishments in California
American companies established in 2014
Transport companies established in 2014
2020 mergers and acquisitions
Amazon (company) acquisitions